Asyndeton (from the , "unconnected", sometimes called asyndetism) is a literary scheme in which one or several conjunctions are deliberately omitted from a series of related clauses. Examples include veni, vidi, vici and its English translation "I came, I saw, I conquered". Its use can have the effect of speeding up the rhythm of a passage and making a single idea more memorable. Asyndeton may be contrasted with syndeton (syndetic coordination) and polysyndeton, which describe the use of one or multiple coordinating conjunctions, respectively.

More generally, in grammar, an asyndetic coordination is a type of coordination in which no coordinating conjunction is present between the conjuncts.

Quickly, resolutely, he strode into the bank.

No coordinator is present here, but the conjoins are still coordinated. 
Asyndetic coordination is the omission of conjunctions between words or phrases that would typically be connected by conjunctions such as "and" or "or." In this sentence, there are no coordinating conjunctions that are omitted. "Quickly" and "resolutely" are simply two adverbs modifying the verb "strode," but they are not being coordinated with each other. Therefore, there is no asyndetic coordination in this sentence.

Examples

Omission of conjunction "and" 

Aristotle wrote in his Rhetoric that this device was more effective in spoken oratory than in written prose:

"Thus strings of unconnected words, and constant repetitions of words and phrases, are very properly condemned in written speeches: but not in spoken speeches — speakers use them freely, for they have a dramatic effect. In this repetition there must be variety of tone, paving the way, as it were, to dramatic effect; e.g., 'This is the villain among you who deceived you, who cheated you, who meant to betray you completely'". Aristotle, Rhetoric, Book III, Chapter 12 (trans. W. Rhys Roberts).

Aristotle also believed that asyndeton can be used effectively in endings of works, and he himself employs the device in the final passage of the Rhetoric:
"For the conclusion, the disconnected style of language is appropriate, and will mark the difference between the oration and the peroration. 'I have done. You have heard me. The facts are before you. I ask for your judgement'". Aristotle, Rhetoric, Book III, Chapter 19 (trans. W. Rhys Roberts).

Several notable examples can be found in American political speeches:
"...and that government of the people, by the people, for the people shall not perish from the earth". Abraham Lincoln, Gettysburg Address
"...that we shall pay any price, bear any burden, meet any hardship, support any friend, oppose any foe to assure the survival and the success of liberty." John F. Kennedy Inaugural Address, 20 January 1961.

Another frequently used example is Winston Churchill's address, "We shall fight on the beaches":

"We shall go on to the end, we shall fight in France, we shall fight on the seas and oceans, we shall fight with growing confidence and growing strength in the air, we shall defend our Island, whatever the cost may be, we shall fight on the beaches, we shall fight on the landing grounds, we shall fight in the fields and in the streets, we shall fight in the hills; we shall never surrender. . ."

Omission of conjunction "or" 
An asyndeton of "or" before a polysyndeton of "and":

 "A parson or what looked like one was laboring over the crest of the hill and coming toward them with one hand raised in blessing, greeting, fending flies. He was dressed in a dusty frockcoat and carried a walking stick and he wore a pair of octagonal glasses on the one pane of which the late sun shone while a watery eye peered from the naked wire aperture of the other." (Cormac McCarthy, Outer Dark, 1968)

See also
Apo koinou construction
Parataxis (grammar)
Reduced relative clause, relative clause not marked by an overt complementizer
Zeugma

Footnotes

Sources 
 Baldrick, Chris. 2008. Oxford Dictionary of Literary Terms. Oxford University Press. New York. 
 Corbett, Edward P. J. and Connors, Robert J. 1999. Style and Statement. Oxford University Press. New York, Oxford. 
 Forsyth, Mark. 2014. The Elements of Eloquence. Berkley Publishing Group/Penguin Publishing. New York.

External links
Asyndetic Coordination @ The Internet Grammar of English
Audio illustrations of asyndeton

Rhetorical techniques
Figures of speech
Grammar